"Lucky Love" is a 1995 song recorded by Swedish group Ace of Base. It is taken from their second album, The Bridge (1995). The song became their fifth worldwide single, and was the first single from the album to be released in Europe; the acoustic version of the song was the second single in the United States and Canada. "Lucky Love" also became the group's first number-one hit in Sweden and it also peaked at number-one in Finland. The single peaked within the top 10 in Belgium, Canada, Denmark, France, Hungary, Israel, Spain, and Zimbabwe. The song's lyrics describes the feeling of being a teenager in love and never forgetting that feeling.

The song was performed for the first time on 4 August 1995 during the 1995 World Championships in Athletics opening ceremony in Gothenburg. It received its radio premiere on 25 September, ahead of its commercial release on 2 October.

Chart performance
"Lucky Love" was very successful on the charts on several continents, becoming one of the group's biggest hits to date. In Europe, it reached number-one in Finland and Sweden, and peaked within the top 10 also in Belgium, Denmark (number two), France, Hungary (number four) and Spain, as well as on the Eurochart Hot 100, where the single made it to number six. Additionally, "Lucky Love" was a top 20 hit in Austria, Germany, Italy, the Netherlands, Norway, Switzerland and the UK. In the latter, it peaked at number 20 in its first week at the UK Singles Chart on November 5, 1995. It stayed at that position for two weeks. Outside Europe, the single peaked at number six in Canada, number nine in Zimbabwe, number 12 in New Zealand, number 29 on the US Cash Box Top 100, number 30 in Australia and on the US Billboard Hot 100. On the Billboard Dance Club Songs chart, "Lucky Love" hit number-one on March 23, 1996.

Critical reception
AllMusic editor Bryan Buss viewed "Lucky Love" as a "pretty" song. Larry Flick from Billboard constated that "this is the single that the act's diehard fans have been screaming for", adding that it is "far more substantial and satisfying" than "Beautiful Life", and "rides a brainseeping chorus that you will be singing to yourself whether you want to or not." Steve Baltin from Cash Box wrote that songs like "Lucky Love" "work because the band downplays the dance sound, displaying some nice understated pop hooks." James Masterton for Dotmusic felt it "doesn't mark much of a progression from their earlier work, which is either a sign of stagnancy or a pretty shrewd move, depending on your point of view." Dave Sholin from the Gavin Report commented, "Proving their particular style of music comes in all shapes and colors, Jenny, Linn, Buddha, and Joker roll into '96 with a song that people like B96-Chicago MD Erik Bradley were testifying about long before the end of last year. "Lucky Love" was released as their first single in the U.K., where it became an instant smash—a fact that should come as no big surprise to anyone who's heard the song. More than a few programmers predict Number One, and you'll get no argument here." 

Ross Jones from The Guardian complimented it as "quite a pretty tune". Robbie Daw from Idolator described it as "bouncy". Jean Rosenbluth from Los Angeles Times deemed it "eminently hummable". Brian A. Gnatt from The Michigan Daily picked it as "the best track" from the album, "with its incredibly warm feel and catchy chorus." He added that it "tackles new ground for the band and captures it easily." Pan-European magazine Music & Media noted that "all the hits from the Happy Nation CD are a hard act to follow, but the Swedish quartet succeeds here hands down. Are they maybe on a special frequency allowing them to download top melodies?" Chuck Campbell from Scripps Howard News Service called it "merely competent."

Music video
Two music videos were produced for the song. One for the European market and another for the US market. The first version was later published on Ace of Base's official YouTube in January 2015. The video has amassed more than 8.5 million views as of August 2022.

European version
The first, released in Europe, directed by Rocky Schenck and featuring the original version of the song, focuses on a middle-aged woman reuniting with the boyfriend she had as a teenager. The band is seen around the actors in the video and also though footage shot by the band themselves using a handheld video camera. The video was shot in Gothenburg in August 1995. An alternate edit of this version featuring the acoustic version of the song was featured on the 2008 Greatest Hits DVD.

US version (acoustic version)
The second video, released in North America and featuring the acoustic version of the song, focuses on several young couples interacting in various scenarios with shots of the band cut in. A shot of the video for "Beautiful Life" can be seen on a television screen in this version. This version was filmed on 29 and 30 January 1996 at Hampton Court House.

Track listings

 CD single, Australia
 "Lucky Love" – 2:52
 "Lucky Love" (acoustic version) – 2:52
 "Lucky Love" (extended original version) – 4:49

 CD single, US
 "Lucky Love" (acoustic version) – 2:52
 "Lucky Love" (Frankie Knuckles Edit) – 3:41

 CD maxi, UK
 "Lucky Love" – 2:52
 "Lucky Love" (acoustic version) – 2:52
 "Lucky Love" (Raggasol Version) – 2:53
 "Lucky Love" (Amadin Mix) – 5:39
 "Lucky Love" (Armand's British Nites Mix) – 11:21

 CD maxi, US
 "Lucky Love" (Frankie Knuckles Classic Club Mix) – 7:22
 "Lucky Love" (Vission Lorimer Funkdified Mix) – 6:02
 "Lucky Love" (Amadin Mix) – 5:39
 "Lucky Love" (Lenny B's Club Mix) – 7:08
 "Lucky Love" (Armand's British Nites Mix) – 11:21
 "Lucky Love" (acoustic version) – 2:52

Personnel
 Vocals by Linn Berggren, Jenny Berggren 
 Backing Vocals by Jeanette Söderholm
 Guitar by Chuck Anthony and Jonas Berggren
 Fretless Bass by Per Ahlström
 Music by Jonas Berggren 
 Lyrics by Jonas Berggren and Billy Steinberg
 Produced by Denniz Pop, Max Martin and Jonas Berggren
 Recorded and produced at Cheiron Studios

Release history

Charts

Weekly charts

Year-end charts

References

1995 singles
1995 songs
Ace of Base songs
Mega Records singles
Music videos directed by Rocky Schenck
Number-one singles in Finland
Number-one singles in Sweden
Song recordings produced by Denniz Pop
Song recordings produced by Max Martin
Songs written by Billy Steinberg
Songs written by Jonas Berggren